This is a list of commercial banks in Lesotho

 Standard Bank
 Nedbank
 First National Bank
 Lesotho Post Bank

External links
 Website of Central Bank of Lesotho

See also
 List of banks in Africa
 Central Bank of Lesotho
 Economy of Lesotho

References

 
Banks
Lesotho
Lesotho